The 2022 Darwin Triple Crown (know for commercial purpose as the 2022 Merlin Darwin Triple Crown) was a motor racing event held as a part of the 2022 Supercars Championship from Saturday 18 June to Sunday 19 June 2022. The event was held at the Hidden Valley Raceway in Darwin, Northern Territory. It was the sixth round of the 2022 Supercars Championship and consisted of three races of 110 kilometres each. The 2022 Darwin Triple Crown was the 2022 season's indigenous round, with teams required to make a livery change to represent the first nations culture for the round. Walkinshaw Andretti United opted to re-use their special livery in Townsville for NAIDOC Week.

Results

Race 1

Race 2

Race 3

Championship standings after the race

Drivers' Championship standings

Teams'' Championship standings

 Note: Only the top five positions are included for standings.

References

Darwin Triple Crown
Darwin Triple Crown
Sport in Darwin, Northern Territory
2020s in the Northern Territory
Motorsport in the Northern Territory